Jocelyn Rae (born 20 February 1991) is a British former tennis player.

Rae has a career-high doubles ranking of 67 by the Women's Tennis Association (WTA), achieved on 22 February 2016. In her career, she won one singles title and 23 doubles titles on the ITF Women's Circuit.

Together with Colin Fleming, she won the gold medal in the mixed doubles at the 2010 Commonwealth Games in Delhi for Scotland (qualifying through her Stirlingshire-born father). She was coached by former professional tennis player and fellow Scot, Karen Paterson. She is openly lesbian.

Career

Junior (2006–2009)
Rae played her first match on the ITF Junior Circuit in April 2006 and continued to compete as a junior until July 2009. During this time, her greatest successes came in doubles although she did win one title at the 2006 Egypt International Championships. She also reached one semifinal and three quarterfinals in singles. In doubles, Rae won three titles (two with Hannah James and one with Amanda Elliott) as well as reaching one more final and three semifinals, one of which was in the 2008 Wimbledon girls' doubles, partnering Jade Curtis. They lost, 6–4, 3–6, 4–6, to Polona Hercog and Jessica Moore, the sixth seeded team who went on to win the title. Rae ended her junior career with win–loss records of 21–18 in singles and 26–14 in doubles. Her career-high combined junior ranking was world No. 167, which she achieved on 23 April 2007.

2014–2017
In February 2014, Rae received her first call up to the British Fed Cup Team, following Laura Robson's withdrawal due to injury.

In July, Rae reached her first WTA Tour doubles final at the Swedish Open, partnering Anna Smith.

In April 2015, Rae won a $50k tournament in Croissy-Beaubourg, France, partnering Anna Smith. In June 2015, she lost the WTA doubles final of the Nottingham Open.

Jocelyn Rae announced her retirement from professional tour in December 2017.

WTA career finals

Doubles: 4 (4 runner-ups)

ITF finals

Singles (1–1)

Doubles (23–7)

Fed Cup participation

Doubles (10–3)

References

External links

 Official website
 
 
 

1991 births
Living people

British female tennis players
Scottish female tennis players
Commonwealth Games gold medallists for Scotland
People from Arnold, Nottinghamshire
Tennis people from Nottinghamshire
Tennis players at the 2010 Commonwealth Games
Commonwealth Games medallists in tennis
Anglo-Scots
21st-century LGBT people
LGBT tennis players
English LGBT sportspeople
Medallists at the 2010 Commonwealth Games